Brihadratha dynasty (Sanskrit: बृहद्रथ; IAST: Bṛhadratha) was the first ruling dynasty of Magadha. Brihadratha was the founder of the dynasty. The name of Brihadratha is also found in the Rigveda (I.36.18, X.49.6). According to Vishnu Purana, Magadha was not only the most valuable kingdom in the Vedic period but was also the center of civilization and power in India.

The earliest known king of Magadha is Brihadratha. The name of Brihadratha appears in Rig-Veda (I.36.18, X.49.6). Magadha is too mentioned in Atharvaveda. The puranic sources say that Brihadrath was the eldest son of Uparichara Vasu. According to the Ramayana, Uparichara Vasu founded Vasumati and Girivraja the capital of dynasty.

History

Brihadratha 

Brihadratha (also Maharatha) was the king of Magadha and the founder of the Brihadratha dynasty. According to the Mahabharata and the Puranas, he was the eldest of the five sons of Uparichara Vasu, the Kuru king of Chedi and his queen was Girika. The name of Brihadratha is also found in the Rigveda.

Jarasandha 

Jarasandha was the son of Brihadratha and the greatest ruler of dynasty. Jarasandha was the most celebrated king of all Brihadratha princes. According to ancient texts there were 24 Brihadratha kings who ruled for many years. However, there was a conflict between Vayu Purana, Matsya Purana and Vishnu Purana regarding the Brihadratha period of rule. The astronomical works based on Vishnu Purana decits that Brihadratha dynasty was last for 1000 years.

Name of Jarasandha appears in Mahabharta and Puranas many times. Jarasandha was inimical to Yadava and that is why he is mentioned as a villain in the Mahabharta.

Bhima with the help of Krishna killed Jarasandha.

Sahadeva 

Sahadeva was the son of Jarasandha, who was placed on the throne of Magadha by the Pandavas after assassination of Jarasandha. Sahadeva fought the Kurukshetra War on the side of the Pandavas. According to the Puranas, he was killed in the Kurukshetra War by Shakuni along with his cousin, Jayadeva. He was succeeded by Somadhi.

Later rulers 

Somadhi (or Somphi) was the son of Sahadeva and placed on the throne of Magadha by Pandavas after he agreed to be a vassal to the Pandavas.

End of dynasty

The last of the Brihadratha dynasty was Ripunjaya, who was killed by a minister named Punika (Pulika). After the death of Ripunjaya, Punika placed his own son Pradyota on throne and founded the Pradyota dynasty in 682 BCE.

List of rulers
Rulers-

See also
 Pradyota dynasty

References

Dynasties of Bengal
Dynasties of India
Magadha
Bihar
Rajgir